Borgan is an island in Nærøysund municipality in Trøndelag county, Norway.

Borgan is not accessible by road, but there is a ferry connection to Ramstadlandet on Ytter-Vikna. Most of the island's residents live on the south side of the island.

See also
List of islands of Norway

References

Islands of Trøndelag
Nærøysund
Vikna